The Albanian American Student Organization of Houston Texas (AASOHTX)  is a non-profit organization that is established by Albanian students in the United States as part of the Texas Chapter of the AASO.

Motto
"së bashku për atdhe"

Goal
To help the local community by bringing together Albanian students and contribute to a better society while promoting Albanian values. The organization has Albanian unity at heart. Its purpose is to bring together Albanian students and teach them about leadership and teamwork while preserving the Albanian values and culture. The organization strives to make young Albanians into excelling, upstanding, ethical leaders.

Purpose

The AASOHTx is organized exclusively for charitable, cultural, and educational purposes concerning the Albanian culture within the meaning of Section 501(c)(3) of the Internal Revenue Code, 1986, or the corresponding provision of any future federal law. Such purposes include but are not limited to:

(a) Promote Albanian culture

(b) Give leadership opportunities to the Albanian youth

(c) Networking opportunities

(d) Create comradeship

(e) Increase interest in Albanian culture

(f)  Provide goodwill to the local community

(g) Preserve Albanian values

Chapters and similar organizations

National

Michigan
 Wayne State University
 University of Michigan - Dearborn
 Michigan State University
 Oakland University
 University of Michigan - Ann Arbor
 Grand Valley State University

Pennsylvania
 Drexel University (ASO)

Connecticut
 University of Connecticut (ASA)

Texas
 North American College (AASOHTX)

International

Canada
 University of Toronto (ASU) 

Australia
 University of Australia (AAUSA)

List of notable Albanian-Americans

References

External links
Albanian American Civil League 
Albanian American Student Organization

Albanian-American history
Diaspora organizations in the United States